Mathematics is a field of study that investigates topics such as number, space, structure, and change.

Philosophy

Nature
 Definitions of mathematics – Mathematics has no generally accepted definition. Different schools of thought, particularly in philosophy, have put forth radically different definitions, all of which are controversial.
 Language of mathematics is the system used by mathematicians to communicate mathematical ideas among themselves, and is distinct from natural languages in that it aims to communicate abstract, logical ideas with precision and unambiguity.
 Philosophy of mathematics – its aim is to provide an account of the nature and methodology of mathematics and to understand the place of mathematics in people's lives.
 Classical mathematics refers generally to the mainstream approach to mathematics, which is based on classical logic and ZFC set theory.
 Constructive mathematics asserts that it is necessary to find (or "construct") a mathematical object to prove that it exists. In classical mathematics, one can prove the existence of a mathematical object without "finding" that object explicitly, by assuming its non-existence and then deriving a contradiction from that assumption.
 Predicative mathematics

Mathematics is
 An academic discipline – branch of knowledge that is taught at all levels of education and researched typically at the college or university level. Disciplines are defined (in part), and recognized by the academic journals in which research is published, and the learned societies and academic departments or faculties to which their practitioners belong.
 A formal science – branch of knowledge concerned with the properties of formal systems based on definitions and rules of inference. Unlike other sciences, the formal sciences are not concerned with the validity of theories based on observations in the physical world.

Concepts
 Mathematical object  an abstract concept in mathematics; an object is anything that has been (or could be) formally defined, and with which one may do deductive reasoning and mathematical proofs. Each branch of mathematics has its own objects.
 Mathematical structure  a set endowed with some additional features on the set (e.g., operation, relation, metric, topology). A partial list of possible structures are measures, algebraic structures (groups, fields, etc.), topologies, metric structures (geometries), orders, events, equivalence relations, differential structures, and categories.
 Equivalent definitions of mathematical structures
 Abstraction  the process of extracting the underlying structures, patterns or properties of a mathematical concept, removing any dependence on real world objects with which it might originally have been connected, and generalizing it so that it has wider applications or matching among other abstract descriptions of equivalent phenomena.

Branches and subjects

Quantity

Number theory is a branch of pure mathematics devoted primarily to the study of the integers and integer-valued functions.
Arithmetic  (from the Greek ἀριθμός arithmos, 'number' and τική [τέχνη], tiké [téchne], 'art') is a branch of mathematics that consists of the study of numbers and the properties of the traditional mathematical operations on them.
Elementary arithmetic is the part of arithmetic which deals with basic operations of addition, subtraction, multiplication, and division.
Modular arithmetic 
Second-order arithmetic is a collection of axiomatic systems that formalize the natural numbers and their subsets. 
Peano axioms also known as the Dedekind–Peano axioms or the Peano postulates, are axioms for the natural numbers presented by the 19th century Italian mathematician Giuseppe Peano. 
Floating-point arithmetic is arithmetic using formulaic representation of real numbers as an approximation to support a trade-off between range and precision.
Numbers  a mathematical object used to count, measure, and label.
List of types of numbers
Natural number, Integer, Rational number, Real number, Irrational number, Transcendental number, Imaginary number, Complex number, Hypercomplex number, p-adic number
Negative number, Positive number, Parity (mathematics)
Prime number, Composite number
Non-standard numbers, including: Infinity, transfinite number, ordinal number, cardinal number, hyperreal number, surreal number, infinitesimal
List of numbers in various languages
Numeral system, Unary numeral system, Numeral prefix, List of numeral systems, List of numeral system topics
Counting, Number line, Numerical digit, Zero
Radix, Radix economy, Base (exponentiation), Table of bases
Mathematical notation, Infix notation, Scientific notation, Positional notation, Notation in probability and statistics, History of mathematical notation, List of mathematical notation systems
Fraction, Decimal, Decimal separator
Operation (mathematics)  an operation is a mathematical function which takes zero or more input values called operands, to a well-defined output value. The number of operands is the arity of the operation. 
Calculation, Computation, Expression (mathematics), Order of operations, Algorithm
Types of Operations: Binary operation, Unary operation, Nullary operation
Operands: Order of operations, Addition, Subtraction, Multiplication, Division, Exponentiation, Logarithm, Root
Function (mathematics), Inverse function
Commutative property, Anticommutative property, Associative property, Additive identity, Distributive property
Summation, Product (mathematics), Divisor, Quotient, Greatest common divisor, Quotition and partition, Remainder, Fractional part
Subtraction without borrowing, Long division, Short division, Modulo operation, Chunking (division), Multiplication and repeated addition, Euclidean division, Division by zero
Plus and minus signs, Multiplication sign, Division sign, Equals sign
Equality (mathematics), Inequality (mathematics), Logical equivalence
Ratio
Variable (mathematics), Constant (mathematics)
Measurement

Structure

Algebra
Abstract algebra
Linear algebra (Outline)
Number theory
Order theory
Function

Space

Geometry
Algebraic geometry
List of algebraic geometry topics
List of algebras
Trigonometry
Differential geometry
Topology
Fractal geometry

Change

Calculus
Vector calculus
Differential equations
Dynamical systems
Chaos theory
Analysis

Foundations and philosophy

Philosophy of mathematics
Category theory
Set theory
Type theory

Mathematical logic

Model theory
Proof theory
Set theory
Type theory
Recursion theory
Theory of Computation
List of logic symbols
Second-order arithmetic is a collection of axiomatic systems that formalize the natural numbers and their subsets. 
Peano axioms also known as the Dedekind–Peano axioms or the Peano postulates, are axioms for the natural numbers presented by the 19th century Italian mathematician Giuseppe Peano.

Discrete mathematics

Combinatorics (outline)
Cryptography
Graph theory
Number theory

Applied mathematics

Mathematical chemistry
Mathematical physics
Analytical mechanics
Mathematical fluid dynamics
Numerical analysis
Control theory
Dynamical systems
Mathematical optimization
Operations research
Probability
Statistics
Game theory
Engineering mathematics
Mathematical economics
Financial mathematics
Information theory
Cryptography
Mathematical biology

History

Regional history

Babylonian mathematics
Egyptian mathematics
Indian mathematics
Greek mathematics
Chinese mathematics
History of the Hindu–Arabic numeral system
Islamic mathematics
Japanese mathematics

Subject history

History of combinatorics
History of arithmetic
History of algebra
History of geometry
History of calculus
History of logic
History of mathematical notation
History of trigonometry
History of writing numbers
History of statistics
History of probability
History of group theory
History of the function concept
History of logarithms
History of the Theory of Numbers
History of Grandi's series
History of manifolds and varieties

Psychology
Mathematics education
Numeracy
Numerical Cognition
Subitizing
Mathematical anxiety
Dyscalculia
Acalculia
Ageometresia
Number sense
Numerosity adaptation effect
Approximate number system
Mathematical maturity

Influential mathematicians
See Lists of mathematicians.

Mathematical notation

 List of algebras
 List of axioms
 List of equations
 List of mathematical functions
 List of types of functions
 List of mathematical jargon
 List of mathematical abbreviations
 List of mathematical proofs
 List of long mathematical proofs
 List of mathematical symbols
 List of mathematical symbols by subject
 List of rules of inference
 List of theorems
 List of theorems called fundamental
 List of unsolved problems in mathematics
 Table of mathematical symbols by introduction date
 Notation in probability and statistics
 List of logic symbols
 Physical constants
 Greek letters used in mathematics, science, and engineering
 Latin letters used in mathematics
 Mathematical alphanumeric symbols
 Mathematical operators and symbols in Unicode
 ISO 31-11 (Mathematical signs and symbols for use in physical sciences and technology)

Classification systems
Mathematics in the Dewey Decimal Classification system

Mathematics Subject Classification – alphanumerical classification scheme collaboratively produced by staff of and based on the coverage of the two major mathematical reviewing databases, Mathematical Reviews and Zentralblatt MATH.

Journals and databases

Mathematical Reviews – journal and online database published by the American Mathematical Society (AMS) that contains brief synopses (and occasionally evaluations) of many articles in mathematics, statistics and theoretical computer science.
Zentralblatt MATH – service providing reviews and abstracts for articles in pure and applied mathematics, published by Springer Science+Business Media. It is a major international reviewing service which covers the entire field of mathematics. It uses the Mathematics Subject Classification codes for organizing their reviews by topic.

See also

List of laws
Lists of mathematics topics
Areas of mathematics
Glossary of areas of mathematics
Mathematics

References

Bibliography

Citations

Notes

External links 

MAA Reviews – The Basic Library List – Mathematical Association of America
Naoki's Recommended Books, compiled by Naoki Saito, U. C. Davis
A List of Recommended Books in Topology, compiled by Allen Hatcher, Cornell U.
Books in algebraic geometry in nLab

+
+
Mathematics
Mathematics
Mathematics-related lists

mk:Преглед на математиката